{{DISPLAYTITLE:Fischer group Fi22}}   

In the area of modern algebra known as group theory, the Fischer group Fi22 is a sporadic simple group of order
   217395271113
 = 64561751654400
 ≈ 6.

History
Fi22 is one of the 26 sporadic groups and is the smallest of the three Fischer groups.  It was introduced by  while investigating 3-transposition groups.

The outer automorphism group has order 2, and the Schur multiplier has order 6.

Representations 

The Fischer group Fi22 has a rank 3 action  on  a graph of 3510 vertices corresponding to its 3-transpositions, with point stabilizer the double cover of the group PSU6(2). It also has two rank 3 actions on 14080 points, exchanged by an outer automorphism.

Fi22 has an irreducible  real representation of dimension 78. Reducing an integral form of this mod 3 gives a representation of Fi22 over the field with 3 elements, whose quotient by the 1-dimensional space of fixed vectors is a 77-dimensional irreducible representation.

The perfect triple cover of Fi22 has an irreducible representation of dimension 27 over the field with 4 elements. This arises from the fact that Fi22 is a subgroup of 2E6(22).
All the ordinary and modular character tables of Fi22 have been computed.  found the 5-modular character table, and  found the 2- and 3-modular character tables.

The automorphism group of Fi22 centralizes an element of order 3 in the baby monster group.

Generalized Monstrous Moonshine

Conway and Norton suggested in their 1979 paper that monstrous moonshine is not limited to the monster, but that similar phenomena may be found for other groups. Larissa Queen and others subsequently found that one can construct the expansions of many Hauptmoduln from simple combinations of dimensions of sporadic groups. For Fi22, the McKay-Thompson series is  where one can set a(0) = 10,

and η(τ) is the Dedekind eta function.

Maximal subgroups 
 found the 12 conjugacy classes of maximal subgroups of Fi22 as follows:

 2·U6(2)
 O7(3) (Two classes, fused by an outer automorphism)
 O(2):S3
 210:M22
 26:S6(2)
 (2 × 21+8):(U4(2):2)
 U4(3):2 × S3
 2F4(2)'  (This is the Tits group)
 25+8:(S3 × A6)
 31+6:23+4:32:2
 S10 (Two classes, fused by an outer automorphism)
 M12

References 

 contains a complete proof of Fischer's theorem.

 This is the first part of Fischer's preprint on the construction of his groups. The remainder of the paper is unpublished (as of 2010).

 
Wilson, R. A.  ATLAS of Finite Group Representations.

External links 
 MathWorld: Fischer Groups
 Atlas of Finite Group Representations: Fi22

Sporadic groups